Abbot Penny's Wall is a monastic boundary wall which once partially enclosed the grounds of Leicester Abbey. It stands in Abbey Park to the west of the City of Leicester, England. The wall was built around 1500 by John Penny, Abbot of Leicester from 1496 to 1509. It is a rare example of medieval English brickwork. Restored in the 19th, 20th and 21st centuries, the wall is now in the care of Leicester City Council and is a Grade I listed structure and a scheduled monument.

History
Leicester Abbey was an abbey of the Augustinian order established in 1143. Founded by Robert de Beaumont, 2nd Earl of Leicester, it became one of the wealthiest and most powerful monastic houses of the Order. In 1496 John Penny became abbot, while also holding office as Bishop of Bangor, and subsequently Bishop of Carlisle. In around 1500, Penny ordered construction of a long boundary wall to the north and west of the abbey, which subsequently became known as Abbot Penny's Wall. The attribution to Penny arises from the initials J.P., which appear in blue brick in the wall, and to John Leland, who published a record of his visit in about 1540, noting that; "This Peny made the new bricke worke in Leicester Abbay, and much of the bricke waulles".

Following the Dissolution of the Monasteries the abbey was demolished in around 1538.

The wall was restored in the 19th and 20th centuries. By the 21st century it was again in disrepair, and sections were threatened with collapse due to undermining from the roots of nearby trees. A survey in 2018 was followed by extensive renovations in 2020–2021. The restoration cost £540,000.

Architecture and description
Abbot Penny's Wall is one of the best remaining examples of Medieval English diapered brickwork. Alan McWhirr, in his study of Leicestershire brick buildings, considers the wall has “some of the most elaborate diaper patterned brickwork to be found in Britain”. The use of brick in Britain dates from the time of the Roman Imperium. Following the Roman evacuation in the 4th century, brick building declined. The Medieval period saw a resurgence in its use as a prestige construction material. Notable examples in Leicestershire include the south towers of Ashby-de-la-Zouch Castle and Kirby Muxloe Castle. Abbot Penny's Wall is built of red and blue brick with Charnwood granite. In addition to John Penny’s initials, J.P., the wall contains a number of patterns picked out in blue brick. These include crosses, a chalice, various “abstract designs” and the monogram IHC. It is a Grade I listed structure and a scheduled monument.

Notes

References

Sources
 
 

Leicester
Archaeological sites in Leicestershire
History of Leicester
Buildings and structures in Leicester
Walls in England
Grade I listed walls
Grade I listed buildings in Leicestershire
Scheduled monuments in Leicester